Charusa District is a district (bakhsh) in Kohgiluyeh County, Kohgiluyeh and Boyer-Ahmad Province, Iran. In a 2006 census, its population was 21,660, in 4,020 families.  The District has one city: Qaleh Raisi. The District has two rural districts (dehestan): Tayebi-ye Sarhadi-ye Gharbi Rural District and Tayebi-ye Sarhadi-ye Sharqi Rural District.

References 

Districts of Kohgiluyeh and Boyer-Ahmad Province
Kohgiluyeh County